Sheth Madhavdas Amarsey High School is a school in Andheri West, Mumbai, India.  The school was founded in 1939. It is a co-educational English and Gujarati medium school.

See also 
 List of schools in Mumbai

References 

1939 establishments in India
Educational institutions established in 1939
High schools and secondary schools in Mumbai